Singapore participated in the 2011 Southeast Asian Games which was held in the cities of Jakarta and Palembang, Indonesia from 11 November 2011 to 22 November 2011, but with some events commencing from 3 November 2011.

Participation details

Singapore sent  a total contingent of 623 to the 2011 SEA Games: of 417 competitors and 206 officials. They participated in 34 of the 48 sports in the Games.

No athletes were fielded for Baseball, Chess, Equestrian, Fin swimming, Futsal, Kenpō, Paragliding, Tennis, Volleyball and Vovinam.

Athletes

Medals

Medals by date

References

2011
Southeast Asian Games
Nations at the 2011 Southeast Asian Games